Didymodon mamillosus, commonly known as Perthshire beardmoss, is a species of moss endemic to Europe. It occurs at only five sites including one in Scotland where it is classified as "Critically Endangered". The other sites are in Iceland, Germany, the Czech Republic and in north-east Spain.

Named as a new species by Alan Crundwell in 1967, the Scottish site at Kirkton Glen in Perthshire was found again in 1998 by Nick Hodgetts. Jan Kucera, working in Bohemia considers it to be a form of D. rigidulus.

References

Pottiaceae
Endemic flora of Scotland
Flora of Europe
Plants described in 1967